Imru' al-Qays ibn 'Amr was the second Lakhmid king. His mother was Maria bint 'Amr, the sister of Ka'b al-Azdi. There is debate on his religious affinity: while Theodor Nöldeke noted that Imru' al-Qays ibn 'Amr was not a Christian Irfan Shahid argued for a possible Christian affiliation, noting that Imru'al Qays' Christianity may have been "orthodox, heretical or of the Manichaean type". Furthermore Shahid asserts that the funerary inscription of Imru' al Qays ibn 'Amr lacks Christian formulas and symbols. Al-Tabari states that "he ruled for the Persians in all the land of the Arabs in Iraq, Hejaz and Mesopotamia". Imru' al-Qays is called in his epitaph inscription: "The king of all Arabs who owned the crown," while the same title (king of all Arabs) was the title given to the kings of Hatra. The same inscription mentions that Imru' al-Qays reached as far as Najran and besieged it from the king, Shammar Yahri'sh. Some scholars have identified "Imru' al-Qays ibn 'Amr" in some South Arabian inscriptions with that one. In those same inscriptions his name is mentioned along with Shammar Yahri'sh, the Himyarite king.

The epitaph, the Namara inscription, is one of the earliest examples of Arabic.

References

Arab Christians in Mesopotamia
Lakhmid kings
3rd-century monarchs in the Middle East
3rd-century Arabs
4th-century monarchs in the Middle East
4th-century Arabs
Dhul-Qarnayn
328 deaths